Pakkun may refer to:
 Patrick Harlan, an American comedian and gaijin tarento
 Pakkun, a Naruto summon
 Petey Piranha, known in Japan as